Texas Stadium was an American football stadium located in Irving, Texas, a suburb west of Dallas. Opened on October 24, 1971, it was known for its distinctive hole in the roof, the result of abandoned plans to construct a retractable roof (Cowboys linebacker D. D. Lewis once famously said that "Texas Stadium has a hole in its roof, so God can watch His favorite team play").

The stadium was the home field of the NFL's Dallas Cowboys for 38 seasons, through 2008, and had a seating capacity of 65,675. In 2009, the Cowboys moved to AT&T Stadium in nearby Arlington.

Texas Stadium was demolished on April 11, 2010, by a controlled implosion.

History

The Cowboys had played at the Cotton Bowl in Dallas since their inception in 1960. However, by the mid-1960s, founding owner Clint Murchison, Jr., felt that the Fair Park area of the city had become unsafe and downtrodden, and did not want his season ticket holders to be forced to go through it. Murchison was denied a request by mayor Erik Jonsson to build a new stadium in downtown Dallas as part of a municipal bond package.

Murchison envisioned a new stadium with sky boxes and one in which attendees would have to pay a personal seat license as a prerequisite to purchasing season tickets. With two games left for the Cowboys to play in the 1967 season, Murchison and Cowboys general manager Tex Schramm announced a plan to build a new stadium in the northwest suburb of Irving.

Texas Stadium, along with Schaefer Stadium (1971), Arrowhead Stadium (1972), Rich Stadium (1973), and the Pontiac Silverdome (1975), was part of a new wave of football-only stadiums (all with artificial turf) built following the AFL–NFL merger. More so than its contemporaries, Texas Stadium featured a proliferation of luxury boxes, which provided the team with a large new income source exempt from league revenue sharing.

It hosted its first game on October 24, 1971, a 44–21 victory over the New England Patriots, and became an icon of the Cowboys with their rise in national prominence. The Cowboys entered the season as defending NFC champions and won their first world title in Super Bowl VI in January 1972. The field was surrounded by a blue wall emblazoned with white stars, a design replicated in its successor, AT&T Stadium.

Texas Stadium's field alignment (between the goal posts) was southwest-to-northeast, perpendicular to the Cotton Bowl, which is southeast-to-northwest.

Roof
The most distinctive element of Texas Stadium was its partial roof, the only one in the NFL. The roof was originally supposed to be the first retractable roof in the NFL. However, it was discovered that the structure could not support the additional weight. This resulted in a partial roof that covered most of the stands but not the playing field itself. Cowboys linebacker D. D. Lewis once famously said that "Texas Stadium has a hole in its roof, so God can watch His favorite team play".

The open roof allowed snow to cover the field in the Thanksgiving Day game against the Miami Dolphins in 1993. The unusual roof also introduced a unique difficulty in televising games, as sunlight would cover part of the field and make it hard for TV cameras to adjust for the changes in light.

The roof was repainted in the summer of 2006 by the city of Irving, the stadium's owners. It was the first time the roof had been repainted since Texas Stadium opened.

Other events

Football

Texas Stadium has hosted five NFC Championship Games. The 1973 Pro Bowl was held at Texas Stadium in front of 47,879 spectators.

The stadium hosted neutral-site college football games and was the home field of the SMU Mustangs for eight seasons, from 1979 through 1986. After the school returned from an NCAA-imposed suspension in 1988, school officials moved games back to the school's on-campus Ownby Stadium to signify a clean start for the football program (since replaced by Gerald J. Ford Stadium in 2000). The 2001 Big 12 Championship Game was held at the site.

In November and December, Texas Stadium was a major venue for high school football. It was not uncommon for there to be high school football tripleheaders at the stadium. Texas Stadium served as a temporary home for two Dallas-area high schools, Plano Senior High School in 1979 after its home stadium was damaged by a prank gone awry, and Highland Park High School while a new stadium on campus was being built.

The stadium has also played host to the two largest capacity crowds for Texas high school football playoff games. In 1977, Plano defeated Port Neches-Groves 13-10 in front of a record crowd of 49,953. In 2006, the matchup between Trinity High School from Euless, and Carroll Senior High School from Southlake, in the second round of the playoffs, ended in a 22-21 Southlake victory (on their way to a fourth 5A state championship in five years) before an announced crowd of 46,339 at Texas Stadium. These games marked two of the top three all-time attendance figures for a Texas high school football game and the stadium recorded three of the top 20 attendance records.

In 1988, Texas Stadium hosted the Class 5A championship game, where Dallas Carter, led by future New York Giants Pro Bowl linebacker Jessie Armstead, defeated Converse Judson 31-14. The University Interscholastic League later stripped Carter of its title due to numerous rule violations. Carter advanced to the final by defeating Odessa Permian 14-9 in the semifinals at Memorial Stadium in Austin in a game highlighted by the book Friday Night Lights: A Town, a Team, and a Dream and its film adaptation. 

In 1994, the stadium hosted the John Tyler vs. Plano East high school football regional playoff, whose wild seesaw finish won it the 1995 Showstopper of the Year ESPY Award.

In the early 2000s, the “Battle of the Axe” rivalry between Lewisville High School and Edward S. Marcus High School was moved to Texas Stadium due to increased animosity and intensity between students of the two schools.

Soccer

In addition to American football, the Dallas Tornado of the NASL used it as their home stadium from 1972 to 1975 and again from 1980 to 1981 when the team folded.

On November 21, 1991, the U.S. Men's National soccer Team played a friendly match against Costa Rica.

Supercross

Texas Stadium hosted a round of the AMA Supercross Championship from 1975 to 1977 and 1983 to 2008.

Bull Riding

The Professional Bull Riders (PBR) held a Bud Light Cup event at Texas Stadium known as the "Battle of the Bulls" during the organization's first two years of existence (1994 & 1995). In both instances, the event was won by three-time PBR world champion Adriano Morães (in 1994 he was the co-champion along with Pat Yancey). The 1995 event was also notable because of rain which turned the dirt into mud, affecting the performance of several bulls.

Lacrosse

On May 25, 2008, Texas Stadium hosted the first ever professional lacrosse game in Texas when the two-time defending Major League Lacrosse champions Philadelphia Barrage played the Long Island Lizards. The Barrage disbanded after the 2008 season while the re-named New York Lizards remained as a member of MLL's Eastern Conference until 2020 when the MLL merged with the Premier Lacrosse League.

Professional Wrestling 

From 1984 to 1988, the stadium hosted the annual World Class Championship Wrestling (WCCW) David Von Erich "Memorial Parade of Champions" professional wrestling card every May. The initial 1984 card drew more than 40,000 fans, the highest attendance of any wrestling card in the state of Texas at that time.

Religious Gatherings

The stadium hosted religious gatherings such as Promise Keepers and Billy Graham crusades; a Graham crusade was the first event held at Texas Stadium.

From October 17 to October 20, 2002, evangelist Billy Graham held the Metroplex Mission crusade in Texas Stadium. Several Christian musical groups also played during the event. Former president George H. W. Bush gave an introduction for Graham on the first night of the crusade.

Concerts

In television
The stadium appeared in numerous episodes of the television series, Walker, Texas Ranger (1993–2001), which was filmed in the Dallas–Fort Worth metroplex.

The stadium appeared in the 1999 movie Any Given Sunday being the home of the "Dallas Knights" in the film.

The stadium has also appeared in the season one finale of Friday Night Lights As a setting for the State Championship game between the Dillon Panthers and the West Cambria Mustangs.

Throughout the network run of the television series Dallas, a number of scenes were filmed on location at Texas Stadium. An overhead shot of the stadium (looking down at the field from the hole in the roof) was also featured prominently as part of the show's opening credits for each of its thirteen seasons on CBS. This trend has continued with the new series with AT&T Stadium taking its place.

Seating capacity

The Cowboys' departure

When opened, the stadium had many amenities that included 381 luxury suites, a stadium club where fans gathered for parties and banquets, and The Corral that provided food, beverages, entertainment and large screen televisions. However, by the 2000s other NFL teams received new stadiums that had more club and luxury seating than Texas Stadium had, so the Dallas Cowboys asked for a new stadium.

The Cowboys left Texas Stadium after the 2008 NFL season for AT&T Stadium (opened for the 2009 NFL season) that was partially funded by taxpayers in Arlington. In November 2004, Arlington voters approved a half-cent (.005 per U.S. dollar) sales tax to fund $325 million of the then estimated $650 million stadium by a margin of 55%-45%. Jerry Jones, the Cowboys' owner, spent over $5 million backing the ballot measure, but also agreed to cover any cost overruns which as of 2006 had already raised the estimated cost of the project to $1 billion.

AT&T Stadium, which has a retractable roof system, also includes a setting that mimics a hole in the roof as a tribute to Texas Stadium.

The Cowboys lost their final game at Texas Stadium to the Baltimore Ravens, 33–24, on December 20, 2008.

Closure
The stadium was scheduled for demolition and implosion on April 11, 2010, as confirmed by the mayor of Irving on September 23, 2009.

Many of the items in the stadium were auctioned off by the city and the Dallas Cowboys including the stadium seats, scoreboard and other pieces of memorabilia.

The City of Irving announced that the Texas Department of Transportation would pay $15.4 million to lease the site for 10 years for use as a staging location for the State Highway 114/Loop 12 diamond interchange. The city has the right to relocate the staging area if redevelopment becomes available.

Demolition

On September 23, 2009, the City of Irving granted a demolition contract to Weir Brothers Inc., a local Dallas based company, for the demolition and implosion of the stadium.

On December 31, 2009, The City of Irving and Kraft Foods announced details of their sponsorship deal for the stadium's implosion — including a national essay contest with the winner getting to pull the trigger that finishes off the stadium. Kraft paid the city $75,000 and donated $75,000 worth of food to local food banks to promote its "Cheddar Explosion" version of Kraft Macaroni & Cheese. The city council unanimously approved the sponsorship deal.

At 7:07 a.m. CDT on April 11, 2010, 11-year-old Casey Rogers turned the key to cause the demolition. From the first explosion, it took approximately 25 seconds for the stadium to completely fall. Debris removal continued until July 2010. Texas's Department of Transportation is using the site as an equipment storage and staging area, after which Irving will decide long-term plans.

In 2013–15, the area around the former stadium has been the epicenter for at least 46 small earthquakes, ranging in magnitude from 1.6 to 3.6.

References

Sources
Shropshire, Mike. (1997). The Ice Bowl. New York: Donald I. Fine Books.

External links

Sarnoff, Nancy. "In Irving, stadium implosion=development opportunity." Houston Chronicle. April 19, 2010.
crossroadsdfw.com shows potential redevelopment plans for the stadium after the Cowboys leave.

1971 establishments in Texas
2010 disestablishments in Texas
American football venues in the Dallas–Fort Worth metroplex
Big 12 Championship Game venues
Buildings and structures in Irving, Texas
Dallas Cowboys stadiums
t
Defunct college football venues
Defunct National Football League venues
Defunct soccer venues in the United States
Demolished sports venues in Texas
Former Major League Lacrosse venues
North American Soccer League (1968–1984) stadiums
Wrestling venues in the Dallas–Fort Worth metroplex
SMU Mustangs football venues
Sports in Irving, Texas
Sports venues completed in 1971
Sports venues demolished in 2010
Soccer venues in Texas
Buildings and structures demolished by controlled implosion